The large moth subfamily Lymantriinae contains the following genera beginning with N:

References 

Lymantriinae
Lymantriid genera N